Lieutenant-General John Folliot or Folliott (baptised 25 January 1691 – 26 February 1762) was an officer of the British Army.

Biography
The eldest son of John Folliott of Ballymacward, Folliot joined the Army as a lieutenant on 1 June 1709. After serving with reputation in the subordinate commissions, he was promoted to the lieutenant-colonelcy of the 1st Regiment of Carabiniers (7th Horse) on 3 July 1737. He was constant in his attention to all the duties of commanding officer of that distinguished corps, and on 15 June 1743 was rewarded with the colonelcy of the 61st Regiment of Foot, from which he was removed on 22 December 1747 to the Royal Irish Regiment. He was promoted to the rank of major-general on 30 March 1754, and in 1756 was appointed major-general on the Staff in Ireland, at a salary of 30 shillings a day; he would hold this post until his death. On 18 January 1758 Folliot was promoted to lieutenant-general. He was Governor of Ross Castle from 1753 until his death.

Besides his military career, Folliot sat in the Irish House of Commons for Longford from 1721 to 1727, for Granard from 1727 to 1760, and for Sligo from 1761 to 1762, when he died at Dublin.

Lieutenant-General Folliot had been left the estates of Lickhill and Mitton in Worcestershire by Rebecca, widow of Arthur Lugg and daughter of John Soley by his wife Anne, sister of the last Lord Folliott, as her nearest relative of the name. On the general's death the estates were inherited by his first cousin John Folliott, MP for Kinsale.

Notes

References

1691 births
1762 deaths
British Army lieutenant generals
Carabiniers (6th Dragoon Guards) officers
Royal Irish Regiment (1684–1922) officers
Irish MPs 1715–1727
Irish MPs 1727–1760
Irish MPs 1761–1768
Members of the Parliament of Ireland (pre-1801) for County Longford constituencies
Members of the Parliament of Ireland (pre-1801) for County Sligo constituencies